George Arnott Walker Arnott of Arlary  (6 February 1799 – 17 April 1868) was a Scottish botanist.

Early life
George Arnott Walker Arnott was born in Edinburgh in 1799, the son of David Walker Arnott of Arlary (near Kinross). He attended Milnathort Parish School then the High School of Edinburgh. He studied law in Edinburgh.

Career

Walker Arnott became a botanist, holding the position of Regius Professor of Botany in the University of Glasgow from 1845 to 1868. He studied the botany of North America with Sir William Hooker and collaborated with Robert Wight in studies of Indian botany.

He and William J. Hooker went through the Australian collected plant material of Alexander Collie, which was sent back to the UK after his death. He was a member of the Societe de Histoire Naturelle in Paris and the Moscow Imperial Society of Natural History.

Personal life and death

Walker Arnott married Mary Hay Barclay in 1831. He died in Glasgow in 1868, aged 69, and is buried in Sighthill Cemetery.

Standard author abbreviation

References

External links

Scottish botanists
Botanists with author abbreviations
1799 births
1868 deaths
Fellows of the Linnean Society of London
Academics of the University of Glasgow
Members of the Faculty of Advocates
Alumni of the University of Edinburgh
Scientists from Edinburgh
People educated at the Royal High School, Edinburgh
19th-century British botanists
Fellows of the Royal Society of Edinburgh